The Maldivian National Emblem consists of a coconut palm, a crescent, and two criss-crossing National Flags with the traditional Title of the State.

Interpretation
The depicted coconut palm represents the livelihood of the Nation according to Maldivian folklore and tradition. The inhabitants believe it to be the most beneficial tree to them as they utilize every part of the tree on various applications ranging from medicine to boat building. The crescent (a universal Islamic symbol) and its accompanying star embodies the Islamic faith of the State and its authority respectively.

The words of the scroll Ad-Dawlat Al-Mahaldheebiyya are written in the Arabic naskh style of script. They were used by Sultan AI-Ghazee Mohamed Thakurufaanu Al-Azam one of the most illustrious heroes of the nation. The title Ad-Dawlat Al-Mahaldheebiyya means the "State of the Mahal Dibiyat", which is the name Ibn Battuta and other Medieval Arab travellers used to refer to the Maldives.

Modern Usage
The Coat of Arms is a symbolic representation of the Government of Maldives and is used frequently in official documents (on the header right underneath the Bismillah) and other Governmental Representations.

Former versions
The crescent and star in the middle of the Maldive Coat of Arms used to be pale blue and white (silver) at the time of its first design in the 1940s during Muhammad Amin Doshimēna Kalēgefānu's regency. The color of the crescent and star was changed to gold in the 1990s.

References 

National symbols of the Maldives
Maldives
Maldives
Maldives
Maldives